Grenville W. "Gren" Goodwin (1898 – 27 August 1951) was Mayor of Ottawa for several months in 1951.  His hometown was Prescott, Ontario and he was an optometrist by profession. He moved to Ottawa in 1911. He served in France during World War I, where he was injured. Upon returning to Canada, he attended the University of Toronto and graduated from the Royal College of Science, Toronto. He also attended the American College of Optics in Detroit.

Goodwin defeated incumbent mayor E.A. Bourque in December 1950 by approximately 10,000 votes. But Goodwin's term in office was cut short at age 53.  He had an unexpected heart failure and died shortly afterwards at the Ottawa Civic Hospital. Charlotte Whitton was immediately appointed the city's next mayor.

References

1898 births
1951 deaths
Mayors of Ottawa
Ottawa controllers
Canadian military personnel from Ontario
Canadian Expeditionary Force soldiers
Canadian Army soldiers
People from Leeds and Grenville United Counties
Canadian military personnel of World War I
University of Toronto alumni
Canadian optometrists
Members of the United Church of Canada